Doug Pelfrey (born September 25, 1970 in Fort Thomas, Kentucky) is a former American football placekicker for the Cincinnati Bengals. Pelfrey played college football at the University of Kentucky.

Professional career
In 1997, Pelfrey surpassed Horst Muhlmann's record for consecutive extra points (101) by a Cincinnati Bengals kicker.

Pelfrey is also known for his charitable work, starting the Kicks for Kids Foundation to help children in the Greater Cincinnati area pursue their dreams.

Pelfrey is the only player to kick two field goals (including a career-best 54-yarder as time expired) within six seconds to win a game - 1994 Week 16, Philadelphia Eagles at Cincinnati Bengals. 

In 1996, Pelfrey became the most accurate kicker in NFL history. As of 2019, his 77.2 career FG percentage ranked 68th in NFL history.

NFL career statistics

External links
 Doug Pelfrey's Kicks for Kids
 Pro Football Reference
 YouTube of end of 1994 Week 16 game

1970 births
Living people
American football placekickers
Kentucky Wildcats football players
Cincinnati Bengals players
Players of American football from Kentucky